Richard P.A.C. Newman (1955–2000) was a physicist notable for his work in the area of cosmology and general relativity.

He completed his PhD in 1979 at the University of Kent at Canterbury under G.C. McVittie with a thesis entitled Singular Perturbations of the Empty Robertson-Walker Cosmologies.

He was a research fellow at the University of York 1984-1986.

He died in 2000.

Selected publications
Newman, R. P. A. C., & McVittie, G. C., A point particle model universe, in Gen. Rel. Grav. 14, 591 (1982)
Newman, R. P. A. C., Cosmic censorship and curvature growth, in Gen. Rel. Grav. 15, 641 (1983)
Newman, R. P. A. C., A theorem of cosmic censorship: a necessary and sufficient condition for future asymptotic predictability, in Gen. Rel. Grav. 16, 175 (1984)
Newman, R. P. A. C., Cosmic censorship, persistent curvature and asymptotic causal pathology, in Classical General Relativity, eds. Bonnor, W. B., Islam, J. N., & MacCallum, M. A. H. (Cambridge University Press, 1984)
Newman, R. P. A. C., Compact space-times and the no-return-theorem in Gen. Rel. Grav. 18, 1181-6 (1986)
Newman, R. P. A. C., Black holes without singularities in Gen. Rel. Grav. 21 981-95 (1989)
Joshi, P. S., & Newman, R. P. A. C., General constraints on the structure of naked singularities in classical general relativity, Research report, Mathematical Sciences Research Centre, The Australian National University, Canberra (1987)
Kriele, M., & Newman R. P. A. C., Differentiability considerations at the onset of causality violation in Classical and Quantum Gravity, vol. 9, no. 5 (1992) pp. 1329–1334
Newman, R. P. A. C., Conformal singularities and the Weyl curvature hypothesis in Rend. Sem. Mat. Univ. Pol. Tor. 50, 61-67 (1992)
Newman, R. P. A. C., On the Structure of Conformal Singularities in Classical General Relativity, in Proc. R. Soc. Lond. A 443 (1993), pp 473–492
Newman, R. P. A. C., On the Structure of Conformal Singularities in Classical General Relativity: II Evolution Equations and a Conjecture of K P Tod, in Proceedings of the Royal Society of London: Mathematical and Physical Sciences'', vol. 443, no. 1919 (Dec. 8, 1993), pp. 493–515

Footnotes

External links
Former staff of University of York

1955 births
2000 deaths
Alumni of the University of Kent